Larry Craig Morton (born February 5, 1943) is a former American football quarterback who played in the National Football League (NFL) for 18 seasons, primarily with the Dallas Cowboys and Denver Broncos. He played college football at California, receiving All-American honors, and was selected by the Cowboys fifth overall in the 1965 NFL Draft. Following nine seasons on the Cowboys, a quarterback controversy with Roger Staubach led to Morton joining the New York Giants for three seasons. He spent his final six seasons as a member of the Broncos, winning NFL Comeback Player of the Year and AFC Offensive Player of the Year in 1977.

Morton is the first starting quarterback to appear in the Super Bowl with more than one franchise, having helped lead the Cowboys to Super Bowl V and the Broncos to Super Bowl XII. He is also the only quarterback to start for multiple franchises in their inaugural Super Bowl appearance. Morton was inducted to the College Football Hall of Fame in 1992.

Early years
Morton is a 1961 graduate of Campbell High School in Campbell, California, where he received All-state honors in football baseball and basketball. In football, he received  honors as a senior.

As a pitcher, Morton received offers from major league teams to play in their minor league systems. Morton was voted Northern California high school athlete of the year as a quarterback and was selected to play in the annual California Shrine High School football game.

College career
Morton played college football at the University of California, Berkeley, under head coach Marv Levy and assistant coach Bill Walsh, both future NFL head coaches and members of the Pro Football Hall of Fame. Morton became the starter in the sixth game of his sophomore season in 1962. Back then his nickname was "Big Hummer" and his production dominated the Golden Bears offense output.

As a sophomore in 1962, he only played in the last five games because of a knee injury he suffered in practice while returning punts. He still managed 905 passing yards, a 54% completion rate and 9 touchdowns. As a junior in 1963 he already owned most of Cal's all-time quarterback records.

In his three seasons as a starter at Cal, he never played on a winning team. He completed 185 of 308 passes for 2,121 yards and 13 touchdowns in his senior season in 1964, but even with a losing 3–7 record, he was recognized for his talent and contributions by being named first-team All-American over other winning quarterbacks. He also received the W. J. Voit Memorial Trophy, given to the best player on the Pacific Coast and the Pop Warner Trophy, given to the best senior player. In the balloting for the Heisman Trophy won by John Huarte of Notre Dame, Morton was seventh, ahead of Joe Namath of Alabama and Gale Sayers of Kansas.

Morton finished his college career with 4,501 passing yards (a Pac-8 record), and most of Cal's All-time passing records, including:
 Touchdown passes in one game (5)
 Touchdown passes in a season (13)
 Touchdown passes in a career (36)
 Total yards in one game (285)
 Passing yards in a career (4,501)
 Passing yards in a season (2,121)
 Most passing completions and attempts in one game
 Most passing completions and attempts in a season
 Most passing completions and attempts in one game

In 1964 as the starting quarterback for the West, he faced Roger Staubach in the East–West Shrine Game, which was a sign of things to come.

He was inducted into the College Football Hall of Fame, the Cal Athletic Hall of Fame and the San Jose Sports Hall of Fame.

Professional career

Dallas Cowboys
Morton was selected by the  Dallas Cowboys fifth overall in the 1965 NFL Draft. He spent his first four seasons as the backup for Don Meredith, but still received opportunities to play due to periodic injuries suffered by Meredith.

In 1969, he became the starter at quarterback over Roger Staubach, after Meredith's unexpected retirement. Morton dislocated a right finger in preseason and had to miss the season opener. In the next three games, he had a 71.1% passing percentage and was seen as having a promising future as the starter. In the fourth game against the Atlanta Falcons, he suffered a separated right shoulder after being tackled by Tommy Nobis. In the next contest against the Philadelphia Eagles, he set club records with 10 consecutive passes and 5 touchdown passes in a single game, although he sat most of the second half. He did not miss any games because of his shoulder, but his effectiveness decreased to 53.6% the rest of the season, as he caused more damage. He had surgery on his right shoulder during the offseason.

In 1970, although he was bothered most of the season recuperating from his right shoulder surgery, he finished third in the NFL in passer rating with 89.8. He also led the Cowboys to Super Bowl V, where the team lost 16–13 to the Baltimore Colts. He had surgery on his right elbow during the offseason.

In 1971, head coach Tom Landry created one of the most famous quarterback controversies in NFL history, when he began alternating Morton with Staubach as the starting quarterback, reaching its extreme against the Chicago Bears, where they alternated between plays. After this famous game, Landry settled on Staubach and the Cowboys went on a 10-game winning streak that included a 24–3 victory in Super Bowl VI over the Miami Dolphins.

In 1972, Staubach suffered a separated right shoulder in the third preseason game against the Los Angeles Rams and Morton was named the starter. Although Staubach was activated in the fifth game of the season, by then Morton was entrenched at quarterback. For the first time since 1969, his arm had regained its strength, helping him register 185 completions (club record) out of 339 attempts (54.6%), 2,396 yards (fifth in the league), 15 touchdowns and 21 interceptions. He was replaced late in the third quarter of the first-round playoff game against the San Francisco 49ers. Staubach entered an apparently hopeless situation trailing 28–13 and threw two touchdown passes in the last 90 seconds to win the game 30–28, eventually sealing Morton's fate with the team.

On March 18, 1974, he was selected by the Birmingham Americans in the second round (18th overall) of the WFL Pro Draft. On April 10, after repeatedly asking for a trade, Morton signed a contract with the Houston Texans of the World Football League for their 1975 season. He never played a down with them; he was traded to the New York Giants six games into the 1974 season, in exchange for their number-one draft choice in 1975 (#2-Randy White) and a second-round draft choice in 1976 (#40-Jim Jensen).

New York Giants
After acquiring Morton, the Giants traded their starting quarterback Norm Snead to the San Francisco 49ers in exchange for a third-round draft choice in 1975 and a fourth in 1976. During his time with the Giants, he struggled along with the team, and "felt the vocal wrath of the fans." In his 34 career games with the Giants over three seasons, he had an 8–25–0 record, throwing for a total of 5,734 yards, 29 touchdowns, 49 interceptions and a 52.1 completion percentage.

Denver Broncos
At age 34, Morton revived his career with the Broncos, finishing the season as the second-rated passer in the AFC. Morton was named the NFL Comeback Player of the Year for 1977 and selected All-AFC by the Sporting News. Although he suffered in the playoffs from a swollen left hip that needed to be drained, he overcame the injury to become the first NFL quarterback to start the Super Bowl for two different teams (Dallas in V and Denver in XII), a feat only equaled by Kurt Warner, Peyton Manning, and Tom Brady. Morton is also the only quarterback to have started for two different teams' inaugural Super Bowl appearances. Unlike Warner, Manning, and Brady, however, Morton would not win a Super Bowl as a starter. He threw a franchise playoff record four interceptions in Denver's defeat against his former team, the Cowboys, which led to him being pulled in favor of Norris Weese.

Morton's best statistical season came in his penultimate 17th season in 1981, when he threw for 3,195 yards and 21 touchdowns and had a 90.5 passer rating. He was a downfield passer not known for his mobility, but is one of the all-time leaders in yards per completion. He briefly held the record for the most consecutive passes completed. His 8.5 yards per attempt that season remains a Broncos franchise record, as do his 54 sacks, and two games where he was sacked seven times each (later matched by Elway and Tim Tebow).

Morton wore number 7 for the Broncos and retired just before the arrival of celebrated rookie John Elway in 1983, who wore the same number and in whose honor it was retired. Morton remains the third all-time passing yards leader in franchise history with 11,895 and his regular-season record was 50 wins and 28 losses in five seasons. 

In 1986, Morton was inducted to the Colorado Sports Hall of Fame. He was inducted into the Denver Broncos' Ring of Fame in 1988.

NFL career statistics

Regular season

Coaching career and later life
Following his playing career, Morton served as head coach for the Denver Gold of the United States Football League (USFL). He was a voter in the Harris Interactive College Football Poll, a component of college football's now-defunct Bowl Championship Series.

In 2008, he co-authored a book with Denver Post writer Adrian Dater entitled "Then Morton Said to Elway..." - The Best Denver Broncos Stories Ever Told. The book was published by Triumph Books.

References

External links
 

1943 births
Living people
All-American college football players
American football quarterbacks
California Golden Bears football players
College Football Hall of Fame inductees
Dallas Cowboys players
Denver Broncos players
New York Giants players
People from Campbell, California
Players of American football from California
Players of American football from Flint, Michigan
Sportspeople from Santa Clara County, California
United States Football League coaches